National Geographic (formerly National Geographic Channel) was a South Korean documentary television channel operated by the Asian operations of National Geographic Global Networks (a part of National Geographic Partners, which is, as of March 2019, a joint venture between the National Geographic Society and The Walt Disney Company). The channel broadcast non-fiction television programmes, with most of shows coming from the National Geographic Society.

Prior to the launch of NGC in South Korea, video documentaries produced by National Geographic Society were broadcast on the terrestrial TV channels. Previously, a Pan-Asian version was available to South Korean viewers. However, it was replaced by a dedicated local version broadcast from Seoul in February 2004.

While the channel drew most of programmes from the National Geographic Society, it also broadcast a percentage of South Korean productions as South Korean regulations on television channels mandated to do so.

The pan-Asian version of Nat Geo Wild and Nat Geo People television channels are available in South Korea, and have served as a companion to this channel for many years; certain programmes were also shown on National Geographic South Korea.

In December 2019, National Geographic notified that the channel would cease transmission on 31 December 2019, and would be replaced by the network's Southeast Asia feed the next day.

See also 
 National Geographic Society
 National Geographic (magazine)
 National Geographic Global Networks

References

Television channels in South Korea
South Korea
Television channels and stations established in 2004
2004 establishments in South Korea
Television channels and stations disestablished in 2019
2019 disestablishments in South Korea